Mansfield Zoo is a zoo situated in Mansfield, Victoria, Australia. It features a large collection of exotic and native animals, many of which can be hand-fed by visitors.

Species include:

 African lion (including several white lions)
 Agile wallaby
 Alpaca
 American alligator
 American bison
 Arabian camel
 Bare-nosed wombat
 Blackbuck
 Blue peafowl
 Common marmoset
 Cunningham's skink
 Dingo
 Domestic horse
 Eastern blue-tongue lizard
 Eastern grey kangaroo
 Emu
 Fallow deer
 Galah
 Guinea pig
 Helmeted guinea fowl
 Hog deer
 Llama
 Long-billed corella
 Maned wolf
 Masked owl
 Meerkat
 Ostrich
 Red deer
 Red kangaroo
 Rhesus macaque
 Rusa deer
 Sambar deer
 Sulphur-crested cockatoo
 Swamp wallaby
 Tasmanian brushtail possum
 Texas longhorn cattle
 Water buffalo
White-fronted capuchin

References

External links

2000 establishments in Australia
Zoos established in 2000
Zoos in Victoria (Australia)
Tourist attractions in Victoria (Australia)